An osteotome is an instrument used for cutting or preparing bone. Osteotomes are similar to a chisel but bevelled on both sides. They are used today in plastic surgery, orthopedic surgery and dental implantation. 

The chain osteotome, originally referred to simply as the osteotome, was invented by the German physician Bernhard Heine in 1830.  This device is essentially a small chainsaw.

See also
Instruments used in general surgery

References

Orthopaedic instruments